The 2019 Women's LEN Super Cup was the 14th edition of the annual trophy organised by LEN and contested by the reigning champions of the two European competitions for women's water polo clubs. The match was played between CN Sabadell (2018–19 Euro League champions) and Orizzonte Catania (winners of the 2018–19 LEN Trophy) at the Centre Can Llong in Sabadell, Spain, on 26 November 2019.

Italy's Orizzonte Catania upset  Spain's home-team Sabadell and won its second Super Cup, eleven years after its first success in the competition.

Teams

Squads

Head coach: David Palma Lopera

Head coach: Martina Miceli

Match

See also
2019 LEN Super Cup

References

External links
 Official LEN website
 Microplustiming.com (official results website)

Women's LEN Super Cup
S
L
L